.aw is the Internet country code top-level domain (ccTLD) for Aruba. It is administered by SETAR.

Second-level domains
Registrations are permitted directly at the second level, but there is also a .com.aw subdomain intended for commercial sites.
Most of registrations are made via SETARNET's website.

There has also been an increase in .pro.aw registrations intended for Aruban professionals.

See also
Internet in Aruba
Internet in the Netherlands
.nl
.sx
.cw

External links
 IANA .aw whois information
Setar
.pro.aw registry

Communications in Aruba
Country code top-level domains

sv:Toppdomän#A